Avantika Vandanapu (born 25 January 2005), sometimes credited simply as Avantika, is an American actress and dancer. She has worked in several Indian films, predominantly in Telugu language, in addition to commercials. In 2021, she starred in the Disney Channel Original Movie Spin  and in 2022, played the role of Janet Singh in the American comedy Senior Year. She was also the second winner of the Zee TV reality show Dance India Dance Lil Masters North America.

Early life
Vandanapu was born into a Telugu family in San Francisco, California. Her family originally hails from Hyderabad in Telangana, India who emigrated to the United States. She took drama lessons at the American Conservatory Theater.

Career
In 2014, Vandanapu won second place in Dance India Dance Lil Masters (North America Edition).

Vandanapu entered Telugu cinema in 2015 and was signed for two movies. She was selected to play the role of Chutki in 14 Reels Entertainment's Krishna Gaadi Veera Prema Gaadha, which was released in February 2016. However, due to the scheduling conflicts, she could not continue with the movie. Vandanapu officially debuted as a child artist in Brahmotsavam starring Mahesh Babu, Kajal Aggarwal, Samantha and Pranitha Subhash which started shooting on September 16, 2015. She then appeared in Chandra Shekhar Yeleti's film Manamantha. Later, she signed on for Premam starring Naga Chaitanya and Shruti Hassan, in which she portrays the younger version of Madonna Sebastian.

In 2021, Vandanapu played the lead role of Rhea Kumar in the Disney Channel Original Movie, Spin which stars Meera Syal, Abhay Deol, Aryan Simhadri, Michael Bishop, Jahbril Cook, Anna Cathcart and Kerri Medders. Vandanapu was announced to portray Karen Smith in the upcoming film adaptation of the Broadway musical Mean Girls, based on the 2004 movie of the same name.

Filmography

As actress

Series
Diary of a Future President
Mira, Royal Detective
The Sex Lives of the College Girls

References

External links 

 

Living people
2005 births
People from Union City, California
American film actresses
American television actresses
American voice actresses
American child actresses
American actresses of Indian descent
American people of Telugu descent
Kuchipudi exponents
Telugu actresses
Performers of Indian classical dance
American female dancers
Dancers from California
American expatriate actresses in India
Actresses in Telugu cinema
Actresses in Tamil cinema
21st-century American actresses